Cedar Creek is a stream in Clark County in the U.S. state of Missouri. It is a tributary of the Des Moines River.

It flows east crossing under Missouri Route 81 north of Anson. It continues to the southeast and east approximately four miles to its confluence with the Des Moines River at  approximately two miles south of Croton, Iowa.

Cedar Creek was named for the red cedar timber along its course.

See also
List of rivers of Missouri

References

Rivers of Clark County, Missouri
Rivers of Missouri